David Charles "Dave" Berkoff (born November 30, 1966) is an American former competition swimmer, Olympic champion, and former world record-holder in two events.  Berkoff was a backstroke specialist who won a total of four Olympic medals during his career at two different Olympic Games. He is best known for his powerful underwater start, the eponymous "Berkoff Blastoff".

Biography
At the 1988 Summer Olympics in Seoul, South Korea, he won a gold medal by swimming the backstroke leg for the winning U.S. men's team in the men's 4×100-meter medley relay in the event final.  Individually, he also won a silver medal by placing second in the men's 100-meter backstroke event.

Four years later at the 1992 Summer Olympics in Barcelona, Spain, Berkoff earned another gold medal by swimming for the winning U.S. team in the preliminary heats of the men's 4×100-meter medley relay.  He also won a bronze medal by placing third in the 100-meter backstroke.

Berkoff was inducted into the International Swimming Hall of Fame as an "Honor Swimmer" in 2005.

See also
 List of members of the International Swimming Hall of Fame
 List of Olympic medalists in swimming (men)
 World record progression 100 metres backstroke
 World record progression 4 × 100 metres medley relay

References

External links
 
 

1966 births
Living people
American male backstroke swimmers
World record setters in swimming
Harvard Crimson men's swimmers
Olympic bronze medalists for the United States in swimming
Olympic gold medalists for the United States in swimming
Olympic silver medalists for the United States in swimming
Sportspeople from Missoula, Montana
Swimmers from Philadelphia
Swimmers at the 1987 Pan American Games
Swimmers at the 1988 Summer Olympics
Swimmers at the 1992 Summer Olympics
William Penn Charter School alumni
Medalists at the 1992 Summer Olympics
Medalists at the 1988 Summer Olympics
Pan American Games silver medalists for the United States
Pan American Games medalists in swimming
Universiade medalists in swimming
Universiade gold medalists for the United States
Universiade silver medalists for the United States
Medalists at the 1987 Summer Universiade
Medalists at the 1987 Pan American Games
20th-century American people
21st-century American people